The Alberg 22 is a Canadian trailerable sailboat, that was designed by Swedish-American naval architect Carl Alberg and first built in 1970.

Production
The design was built by Nye Yachts in Belleville, Ontario, later located in Bloomfield, Ontario, Canada. A total of 180 examples were completed before production ended.

Design

The Alberg 22 is a small recreational keelboat, built predominantly of fiberglass, with teak wooden handrails and toe rails, plus other trim. It has a masthead sloop rig, a raked stem, a raised transom, a keel-mounted rudder controlled by a tiller and a fixed long keel. It displaces  and carries  of ballast. Due to its weight and full keel it has been noted as handling like a larger boat.

The outboard motor is fitted to a transom well and the lazarette has space for the fuel tank.

Accommodations are provided for four people in a forward "V"-berth and two quarter berths. The galley is equipped with a sink with a water pump and a removable icebox.

Fitted equipment includes genoa tracks and winches, as well as a halyard winch.

The design has a PHRF racing average handicap of 282 with a high of 276 and low of 288.

Operational history
In a review Michael McGoldrick wrote, "this full keel boat has the proportions of a classic sailboat. It was designed by Carl Alberg, who earned a reputation for drawing extremely seaworthy sailboats. In fact, some people who are now sailing Alberg 30s and 37s got their start with the Alberg 22. The Alberg 22 heels over fairly easily at first, but it reaches a point where it locks in and goes. The full keel and high ballast displacement ratio (almost 50%) suggests that this boat should be able to handle some rough conditions."

In a 2010 review Steve Henkel wrote, "This shippy little craft is almost indistinguishable from a number of similar Alberg designs ... The boat is very good for weekend cruising, though you may find she will get a bit crowded if you bring the kids along ... Best features: The high B/D ratio and long keel provide easy steering and relatively good comfort in cruising mode. The outboard well in the lazarette makes engine access easier and avoids prop cavitation in all but the choppiest seas. Worst features: Unless you are planning to challenge other Albergs of similar size, forget racing. The keel isn't deep enough to take a big enough bite for good close-hauled performance."

See also

List of sailing boat types

Related development
Cape Dory 22

Similar sailboats
Buccaneer 220
Capri 22
DS-22
Edel 665
Falmouth Cutter 22
Hunter 22
J/22
Marlow-Hunter 22
Marshall 22
Pearson Electra
Pearson Ensign
Ranger 22
Santana 22
Seaward 22
Spindrift 22
Starwind 223
Tanzer 22
Triton 22
US Yachts US 22

References

External links

Keelboats
1970s sailboat type designs
Sailing yachts
Trailer sailers
Sailboat type designs by Carl Alberg
Sailboat types built by Nye Yachts